is a Japanese manga series written and illustrated by Haruhisa Nakata. The series was published in Shogakukan's Monthly Ikki from December 2012 to September 2014, when the magazine ceased publication. Shogakukan compiled its chapters into three tankōbon volumes. A sequel, titled Levius/est, was serialized in Shueisha's Ultra Jump from April 2015 to June 2021. The manga and its sequel are licensed in North America by Viz Media. A 12-episode original net animation (ONA) adaptation produced by Polygon Pictures premiered on Netflix in November 2019.

Story
In the 19th century, Imperial City is heavily damaged in a war. A new sport known as "Metalboxing" (which combines the elements of boxing with robotic elements) is developed five years later. Levius Cromwell, who lost his father during the war, begins to emerge as a young fighter and begins training under his uncle Zacks Cromwell after losing his consciousness. Levius works up the boxing ranks until he finally reaches his goal, which is an opportunity to challenge for the promotion to Grade I, which is the highest rank any boxer could achieve. Levius was required to defeat Hugo Stratus to achieve that rank, but Hugo was unexpectedly defeated by a mysterious boxer named A.J. Langdon. The dignity of human beings and the future of Imperial City are in the hands of an ongoing battle between Levius and his opponents.

Characters

Levius is a young boxer who is notable in the sport of "Metalboxing". He deeply cares about the whereabouts of his mother, who fell unconscious during the war. He was required to amputate his right arm (which was replaced with a robotic arm) before the events of the manga due to corrosion after being attacked by an automated object.

Zacks is Levius' uncle; he suffers from congenital tetrachromatic abnormality in his left eye, requiring him to wear an eyepatch over it. He also acts as Levius' trainer due to his previous experience as a regular boxer.

Natalia is a Grade III boxer who trains at Zacks Gym. She offers some advice to Levius about his upcoming matches.

A member of the Amethyst military corporation, A.J. is the youngest soldier who fought in the war. She was not expected to be Levius' opponent in his Grade II promotion match; however, she defeated Hugo Stratus in a controversial fashion. After that match, she attacked Levius, which created a steam explosion that caused him to seek medical treatment.

Media

Manga
Levius is written and illustrated by Haruhisa Nakata. Different from almost manga series in Japanese are drawn and written in tategaki (vertically, lines are right to left), the story line of Levius is written in yokogaki (horizontally, left to right), with drawing style of Bande dessinée. It was serialized in Shogakukan's Monthly Ikki from December 25, 2012, to September 25, 2014, when the magazine ceased its publication.<ref></p></ref><ref></p><p></ref> The last issue announced that the series would continue serialization, but details were not given then. Shogakukan collected its chapters in three tankōbon volumes, released from January 30 to December 26, 2014. Shueisha republished the series in two volumes under the Young Jump Comics imprint on April 19 and May 17, 2019.

A sequel, titled Levius/est, was serialized in Shueisha's Ultra Jump from April 18, 2015, to June 18, 2021. Shueisha collected its chapters in ten tankōbon volumes, released from December 18, 2015, to August 18, 2021.

In North America, Viz Media announced the English language release of the manga in February 2019. Levius was released in a single omnibus volume on September 17, 2019. Viz Media began publishing Levius/est on November 19, 2019.

Volume list

Levius

Levius/est

Original net animation
A 12-episode original net animation (ONA) adaptation, produced by Polygon Pictures premiered on Netflix on November 28, 2019. The series was broadcast in Japan on Tokyo MX and BS11 from January 9 to March 27, 2021. Nana Mizuki performed the series opening theme "Link or Chains", while Mamoru Miyano performed the ending theme "Beautiful Doll". Viz Media will release the series on Blu-ray in North America on March 21, 2023.

Notes

References

External links
 
 

2019 anime ONAs
Anime series based on manga
Boxing in anime and manga
Dystopian anime and manga
Japanese-language Netflix original programming
Martial arts anime and manga
Netflix original anime
Polygon Pictures
Prosthetics in fiction
Seinen manga
Shogakukan manga
Shueisha manga
Steampunk anime and manga
Viz Media manga